The 1933–34 NCAA men's basketball season began in December 1933, progressed through the regular season and conference tournaments, and concluded in March 1934.

Rule changes
 The "10-second" rule went into effect, requiring the team on offense to get the ball past the midcourt line within 10 seconds.
 A new substitution rule allowed each player to re-enter a game twice. Previously, each player could re-enter a game only once.
 The number of referees increased from one to two.

Season headlines 

 The Metropolitan New York Conference began play, with 10 original members.
 In February 1943, the Helms Athletic Foundation retroactively selected Wyoming as its national champion for the 1933–34 season.
 In 1995, the Premo-Porretta Power Poll retroactively selected Kentucky as its national champion for the 1933–34 season.

Conference membership changes

NOTE: Columbia joined the Metropolitan New York Conference while remaining a member of the Eastern Intercollegiate Basketball League. It retained its membership in both until 1939.

Regular season

Conference winners and tournaments

Statistical leaders

Awards

Consensus All-American team

Major player of the year awards 

 Helms Player of the Year: Wesley Bennett, Westminster (Pa.) (retroactive selection in 1944)

Coaching changes 

A number of teams changed coaches during the season and after it ended.

References